Tinfos  is a private Norwegian holding company. Its roots dates back to 1875, and has today the head office in Oslo, Norway.  The firm is one of the oldest companies in its field of activity in Europe.  Its main products are silicomanganese, High Purity Pig Iron and titanium dioxide. The company is structured in 4 different divisions. Tinfos AS was sold 15 April 2008 to the French-based manganese company Eramet. In 2009, Eramet sold the international unit of Tinfos to Holta Invest AS, a Norwegian investment company.

Tinfos Jernverk 

Tinfos Jernverk produces silicomanganese, an alloy used for all steel. The company is the world leader in the production of low carbon silicomanganese for primarily stainless steel. The plant is located in Kvinesdal, Norway.

Tinfos Titan and Iron 

Tinfos Titan and Iron produces titanium dioxide slag for the pigment industry and high quality Pig Iron for the foundry industry at the plant in Tyssedal, Norway. The raw material used in the process is ilmenite.

Energy 

Tinfos is generating energy for its own consumption through hydropower plants in Tyssedal and in Notodden. It is also recovering energy through the thermal power plant in Kvinesdal. The division also promotes small scale turnkey power plants.

Tinfos Nizi 

Tinfos Nizi now Nizi International is responsible for the worldwide trading operations with head offices in Luxembourg.

Sources 
Article about the Tinfos Group on Ponts.org
Article that deals with the Tinfos Group on Blackwell-synergy.com
Squareoil.dk talked about Tinfos gruppen
Article about the Tinfos Gruppen on Factor.no
Article that talks about the Tinfos Group on BDoInternational.com
Article about the Tinfos Group on NGU.no
Their corporative website

References 

Manufacturing companies of Norway
Electric power companies of Norway
Companies based in Telemark
Notodden
Companies established in 1875